HSM or H.S.M. may refer to:

Entertainment
 High School Musical (disambiguation)

Organisations
 Harakat al-Shabaab Mujahedeen or Al-Shabaab, a Somali insurgent group
 Hollandsche IJzeren Spoorweg-Maatschappij, a former Netherlands railway
 Holy Spirit Movement, Uganda
 HSM (company), an American company (previously Hickory Springs)

Science and technology
 Hardware security module, a physical computing device 
 Hepatosplenomegaly, enlargement of the liver and the spleen
 Hierarchical Storage Manager, an IBM program Product for MVS and a component of Data Facility Storage Management Subsystem/MVS
 Hierarchical storage management, in data storage
 Hierarchical state machine, in computer science
 Hyper Sonic Motor, Sigma ultrasonic motor lens focusing technology

Other uses
 Historic Sites and Monuments in Antarctica
 Horsham Airport, Australia, by IATA code
 Humanitarian Service Medal, a U.S. military award